Dr. H.A. May House is a historic home located at Washington, Franklin County, Missouri. It was built about 1904, and is a -story, Queen Anne style frame dwelling.  It has four one story rear ells and one two story side ell.  It features a wraparound porch and a projecting front gable with clipped corners.  Also on the property is a contributing large one story frame garage.

It was listed on the National Register of Historic Places in 2000.

References

Houses on the National Register of Historic Places in Missouri
Queen Anne architecture in Missouri
Houses completed in 1904
Buildings and structures in Franklin County, Missouri
National Register of Historic Places in Franklin County, Missouri